Uncle Dog is a band that released an album and single in 1972.

Line-up
Members of Uncle Dog were: 
Carol Grimes - vocals
Terry Stannard - drums, percussion
Phillip Crooks - guitar
Sam Mitchell - guitar
John Porter - guitar, bass
David Skinner - keyboards, vocals (ex-Twice as Much)
John Pearson - drums

Old Hat
In 1972, the group released one album, "Old Hat".  Pearson played on 4 tracks and was replaced as a member by Terry Stannard who appears on the rest of the album.
Guest musicians on the LP were Paul Kossoff, guitar on "We Got Time" and John 'Rabbit' Bundrick (piano). Most of the songs were penned by Dave Skinner, although there are a few covers, including Bob Dylan's "I'll Be Your Baby Tonight" (from John Wesley Harding) and Sam Phillips/Herman Parker's "Mystery Train".
John Porter became a producer and produced The Smiths and John Lee Hooker's comeback album in 1989.  Mitchell played with Clancy and The Sandmen.  Skinner also played in Clancy and 801 while Legendary Ace Drummer Terry Stannard formed the hit band Kokomo later.

Album listings
Album: Old Hat (Signpost SG 4253) 1972
"River Road"
"Movie Time"
"Old Hat"
"Boogie With Me"
"We Got Time"
"Smoke"
"I'll Be Your Baby Tonight" (Bob Dylan)
"Mystery Train" (Sam Phillips, Herman Parker)
"Lose Me"

Singles released
45: "River Road" b/w "First Night" (Signpost SGP 752) 1972, #86 US Hot 100.

References

External links

English blues rock musical groups
English rock music groups
Musical groups established in 1972
Musical groups disestablished in 1972